Guo Linxiang (September 1914 – 25 April 2010) was a general in the People's Liberation Army of China who served as political commissar of the People's Liberation Army General Logistics Department from 1973 to 1975 and political commissar of the Nanjing Military Region from 1982 to 1985.

Biography
Guo was born in Yongfeng County, Jiangxi, in September 1914. He became a member of the Chinese Communist Party (CCP) in 1933. He had served in the Red Army since 1930, serving in the Encirclement campaigns from 1930 to 1934 and the Long March from 1934 to 1936. During the Second Sino-Japanese War, he fought under deputy commander Peng Dehuai at the Hundred Regiments Offensive. During the Chinese Civil War, he served in the war and engaged in the Battle of Huaiyin, Battle of Lian River, Battle of Yancheng, Menglianggu campaign, Battle of Linfen, Battle of Central Shanxi, and Battle of Taiyuan. 

He was awarded the military rank of major general (shaojiang) in 1955. In 1966, the Cultural Revolution broke out, he was removed from office and effectively sidelined. After the Lin Biao incident, he was reinstated as political commissar of the People's Liberation Army General Logistics Department in August 1973. He was transferred as political commissar to northwest China's  in August 1975, and held that office until January 1978. In January 1980, he was promoted to become first political commissar of the Nanjing Military Region (later as political commissar in October 1982), a position he held until June 1985. In 1987, he was appointed secretary of the Commission for Discipline Inspection of the Central Military Commission, responsible for rectifying discipline in the People's Liberation Army (PLA). He attained the rank of general (shangjiang) in 1988. He retired in 1992.

On 25 April 2010, he died from an illness in Beijing, at the age of 95.

Autobiography

References

1914 births
2010 deaths
People from Yongfeng County
People's Liberation Army generals from Jiangxi
People's Republic of China politicians from Jiangxi
Chinese Communist Party politicians from Jiangxi